Tri.be (stylized as TRI.BE), is a South Korean girl group formed in 2021 by TR Entertainment and Universal Music Group. The group consists of seven members: Songsun, Kelly, Jinha, Hyunbin, Jia, Soeun and Mire. The group debuted on February 17, 2021, with the release of their debut single album Tri.be Da Loca.

Name

Tri.be, is a combination of 'Tri', an abbreviation of 'Triangle', which is a symbol of perfection, and 'Be', which means existence, leading to the meaning of 'perfect existence' or 'perfect being'.

History

Pre-debut
Songsun and Hyunbin were former trainees under Banana Culture Entertainment, involved in one of the company's projects titled "Banana Culture New Kid".

Kelly was a contestant on the Chinese competition show Youth With You 2 under TRI.BE's former pre-debut management company Lion Heart Entertainment. She was eliminated in the first round and ended up at 64th place.

2021–present: Debut with Tri.be Da Loca, Conmigo, Veni Vidi Vici Leviosa and W.A.Y 

On December 29, 2020, it was revealed that producer Shinsadong Tiger and Universal Music Group had intentions to debut a new girl group in early 2021. On January 4, 2021, the group's official social media accounts released an official logo motion video, revealing the group's logo and their name to be Tri.be. The group released teaser and promotional videos in early February, later confirming that they will be debuting later that month. Prior to their debut, they were featured in their first online reality show, Let's Try ! Be, on YouTube through Studio Lululala.

They debuted with their first single album Tri.be Da Loca on February 17, 2021, with the lead single "Doom Doom Ta" and its B-side track "Loca". Both songs in the album were produced by Shinsadong Tiger and member Elly of EXID.

On the same day as their debut, Tri.be was announced to be signed under Universal Music's subsidiary label Republic Records for promotions outside of Korea.

On May 18, 2021, they released their second single album titled Conmigo with the lead single "Rub-A-Dum" and its B-side track "Loro".

On October 12, 2021, Tri.be released their first extended play Veni Vidi Vici with the lead single "Would You Run".

On November 25, 2021, Tri.be released a special winter single titled "Santa For You".

On December 2, 2021, it was announced Tri.be would be participating in the theme song for Cartoon Network's series We Baby Bears. The song, titled "The Bha Bha Song", was released on December 17, 2021, alongside the music video.

On August 9, 2022, Tri.be released their third single album Leviosa with the lead single "Kiss".

On February 14, 2023, Tri.be released their second extended play W.A.Y with the lead single "We Are Young".

Members
 Songsun
 Kelly
 Jinha
 Hyunbin
 Jia
 Soeun
 Mira

Discography

Extended plays

Single albums

Singles

As featured artist

Promotional singles

Videography

Music videos

Filmography

Reality shows

Awards and nominations

Listicles

References

External links
 

2021 establishments in South Korea
Musical groups from Seoul
K-pop music groups
Musical groups established in 2021
South Korean dance music groups
South Korean girl groups
Republic Records artists
Universal Music Group artists